Andrew Delly Marie-Sainte (born 20 August 1998) is a French professional footballer who plays as a defender.

Career
Born in Fort-de-France, Martinique, Marie-Sainte has played for Prato, Napoli and Livorno.

References

1998 births
Living people
French footballers
A.C. Prato players
S.S.C. Napoli players
U.S. Livorno 1915 players
Serie C players
Association football defenders
French expatriate footballers
French expatriate sportspeople in Italy
Expatriate footballers in Italy
Serie B players